Pena Verde is a freguesia in Aguiar da Beira Municipality, Guarda District, Portugal. The population in 2011 was 813, in an area of 29.40 km2. The Pillory of Pena Verde is located in this freguesia.

Demography

References 

Freguesias of Aguiar da Beira